Enderrock is a monthly musical magazine published in Catalan, since 1993. It specializes in the promotion of pop-rock music in the Catalan language and around Catalan speaking areas.

On 2004 it was awarded with a National Award for the social promotion of Catalan language by Government of Catalonia. Since 2001, Enderrock also organizes Sona 9 musical talent contest and the Enderrock awards. Magazine is published by Grup Enderrock, led by Lluís Gendrau. They also publish 440Clàssica.

References

External links
 Official website

1993 establishments in Spain
Catalan-language magazines
Magazines established in 1993
Magazines published in Barcelona
Magazines published in Catalonia
Monthly magazines published in Spain
Music magazines